Secular Schools Ireland is a patron body for national schools in Ireland. It is a voluntary organisation seeking to establish the country’s first secular primary schools.

References

Education in the Republic of Ireland
Educational organisations based in the Republic of Ireland
Secularist organizations